Valluvambram Junction is a small town in Malappuram District, in India.

Location

Valluvambram Junction is on the National Highway between Malappuram and Kozhikode cities. Valluvambram is a village that splits two main highways to Manjeri Gudallur and Malappuram Palakkad. The place is famous for Selling and Buying Used luxury cars and commercial vehicles from 1980s . One of the TVS Vehicles Showroom is situated in this place, Half Valluvambram.

Distance from Valluvambram: 
 Kozhikode: 38 km
 Malappuram: 12 km
 Manjeri: 9 km
 Calicut Airport: 14 km

Nearby villages
 Pookkottur Gram Panchayath
 Pulpatta Gram Panchayath
 Mongam and Morayur
 Cheruputhoor, Thripanachi and Kozhithayi
 Ozhukur and Poonthalaparamba
Valamangalam and Kallachal
 Thadapparamba and Pappatingal
 Athanikkal and Aravankara
 Melmury and Alathurpady
 Valayattapady and Swalath Nagar
 Pullanoor, Moochikkal and Pullara
 Alukkal, Veembur and Pattarkulam

Mongam and Morayur

Mongam and Morayur are two villages lying between Musliyarangadi and Valluvambram towns.  Morayur, in Malayalam, means 'Land of peoples who have manners'. Thinayancherry Elayath, a native of Morayur, was a minister of one of the Zamorin kings. Anwarul Islam Women's Arabic College is an Arabic college affiliated to University of Calicut located at Mongam, in Malappuram district, Kerala. The college is offering afzal ul ulama preliminary, BA (Afzal ul Ulama) and MA in Arabic.

Important Organizations
 Government School, Pookkottoor

Educational Institutions 
 AMUP school Valluvambram
 GVHSS Pullanoor, Valluvambram
 MIC ARTS & SCIENCE College Valluvambram
 MIC English Medium High School Valluvambram

Culture
Valluvambram village is as predominantly Muslim populated area.  Hindus are exist in comparatively smaller numbers.  So the culture of the locality is based upon Muslim traditions.  Duff Muttu, Kolkali and Aravanamuttu are common folk arts of this locality.  There are many libraries attached to mosques giving a rich source of Islamic studies.  Some of the books are written in Arabi-Malayalam which is a version of the Malayalam language written in Arabic script.  People gather in mosques for the evening prayer and continue to sit there after the prayers discussing social and cultural issues.  Business and family issues are also sorted out during these evening meetings.  The Hindu minority of this area keeps their rich traditions by celebrating various festivals in their temples.  Hindu rituals are done here with a regular devotion like other parts of Kerala.

Transportation
Valluvambram Junction is on NH 966. CNG road to Gudalloor gets diverted from here towards Manjeri and NH goes towards Malappuram.

See also
 Pookkottur
 Nediyiruppu

Image Gallery

References

   Cities and towns in Malappuram district
Kondotty area